This is a list of Norwegian television related events from 2002.

Events
2 June - Veronica Agnes Roso wins the second series of Big Brother Norway.
Unknown - Ronny Inderberg, performing as Garth Brooks wins the sixth and final series of Stjerner i sikte.

Debuts

Television shows

2000s
Big Brother Norway (2001-2003, 2011)

Ending this year

Stjerner i sikte (1996-2002)

Births

Deaths

See also
2002 in Norway